Taos Ski Valley is a village and alpine ski resort in the southwestern United States, located in Taos County, New Mexico. The population was 69 at the 2010 census. Until March 19, 2008, it was one of four ski resorts in America to prohibit snowboarding.

The village was originally settled by a group of miners in the 1800s, but in 1955, Ernie and Rhoda Blake founded the area as a ski mountain. The village was incorporated in 1996.

In 2013, Taos Ski Valley, Inc., was sold by the founding family to billionaire conservationist Louis Bacon. It has 110 trails with 24% beginner, 25% intermediate, and 51% advanced/expert. The Ernie Blake Snowsports School is one of the highest rated ski schools in North America.

Geography 

Kachina Village, also  at over 10,350 feet, houses Bavarian Restaurant and two condo complexes and accommodates six permanent residents and visitors in 30 condo units; 70–80 home sites are planned for development.

The village is completely surrounded by Carson National Forest, including bordering designated wilderness.

History 
In the 1800s, present-day Taos Ski Valley was the site of a small copper mining town called Twining, New Mexico, though it was later abandoned. Present day Taos Ski Valley was founded in 1955 by Ernie and Rhoda Blake. They lived in an eleven-foot camper in the absence of any buildings in the area except almost-completed Hondo Lodge (now Snakedance Condominiums). Even after moving into the lodge, they lived without power until 1963. Ernie and Rhoda had been living in Santa Fe, New Mexico. Ernie was managing the Santa Fe Ski Basin.

The first ski lift, a J-bar, was installed in 1956. Until 1957, the ski resort featured only one ski slope, Snakedance. In 1957, the resort installed a second lift—a Poma (platter) lift. Blake was for a time involved in the day-to-day management of the resort, answering the phone and telling prospective visitors whether the skiing was expected to be good in advance of weekend trips.

In December 2013, the billionaire Louis Bacon purchased Taos Ski Valley from the Blake family, who had owned it since 1954.

In 2018, Taos Ski Valley, Inc. started Taos Air, a virtual airline which operates scheduled public air charter service at Taos Regional Airport during ski season. Taos Air began operations to destinations in Texas, offering shuttle service between the airport and the resort, with the Town of Taos providing terminal access, marketing, de-icing service, and a hangar. In 2020, destinations in California were added.

Economy 
Tourism is the village's main industry. As of the 2011–2012 season Taos Ski Valley Corporation employed approximately 700 people during winter months. In an average year $47 million are spent in the local economy of Taos Ski Valley. About $12 million is from ski operations alone. The community is a popular summer and fall vacation destination. In 2005, 55 businesses operated in Taos Ski Valley. Lodging options include hotels, private home rentals, condominiums and alpine styled bed and breakfasts. The town of Taos, located 30 minutes drive down the canyon, provides year-round services.

Demographics 

As of the 2010 census, the Village held 69 people and 272 housing units, with only 14.3% occupied. From 2000 to 2010 population increased 23.2%. The racial makeup was 75.4% White and 24.6% Hispanic or Latino.

In 2000, 12.5% of 32 households had children under the age of 18 living with them, 37.5% were married couples living together, while 59.4% were non-families. 46.9% of all households were made up of individuals, and 3.1% had someone living alone who was 65 years of age or older. The average household size was 1.75 and the average family size was 2.46.

Only 4.3% were under age 18, 5.4% from 18 to 24, 33.9% from 25 to 44, 50.0% from 45 to 64, and 1.8% who were 65 years or older. The median age was 47 years. For every 100 females, there were 166.7 males. The ratio of males to females was 1.66.

The median household income was $67,708, and the median income for a family was $103,422. Males had a median income of $65,833 versus $24,375 for females. The per capita income for the village was $43,143. None of the population were below the poverty line.

Education
Almost all of the CDP is within Taos Municipal Schools, with a very small remainder in Questa Independent Schools. The former operates Taos High School.

See also

 List of municipalities in New Mexico

References

Further reading
 Beardsley, Davis Associates (1973). Taos Ski Valley: Kachina Village Master Plan 
 Carson National Forest (1981). Taos Ski Valley Master Development Plan: Environmental Impact Statement, USFS
 
 Jordan, Louann C. (1978). The Legend of Taos Ski Valley
 Needham, Richard (2006). "Ernie Over Easy" Skiing Heritage Vol 18 #4:13-17
 Nathanson, Rick. "Taos Ski Valley Founder Happy To Add Intimate European Ambience to N.M.'s Skiing Scene". Albuquerque Journal, December 15, 2005.

External links

 Taos Ski Valley Resort
 Taos Ski Valley Chamber of Commerce
 3dSkiMap of Taos Ski Valley

Ski areas and resorts in New Mexico
Villages in Taos County, New Mexico
Sangre de Cristo Mountains
Tourist attractions in Taos County, New Mexico
Ski Valley